3771 Alexejtolstoj (provisional designation ) is a stony Flora asteroid from the inner regions of the asteroid belt, approximately 3.7 kilometers in diameter. It was discovered on 20 September 1974, by Russian–Ukrainian astronomer Lyudmila Zhuravleva at the Crimean Astrophysical Observatory in Nauchnyj on the Crimean peninsula. The asteroid was named after writer Aleksey Nikolayevich Tolstoy.

Orbit and classification 

The S-type asteroid is a member of the Flora family, one of the largest groups of stony asteroids in the main-belt. It orbits the Sun in the inner main-belt at a distance of 1.8–2.6 AU once every 3 years and 4 months (1,212 days). Its orbit has an eccentricity of 0.17 and an inclination of 5° with respect to the ecliptic. The body's observation arc begins at Nauchnyj with its official discovery observation made in 1974.

Physical characteristics 

A fragmentary rotational lightcurve was obtained from photometric observation made at the Palomar Transient Factory in California in December 2011. The lightcurve gave a provisional rotation period of  hours with a low brightness amplitude of 0.08 in magnitude. The Collaborative Asteroid Lightcurve Link assumes an albedo of 0.24 – derived from 8 Flora, the largest member and namesake of its orbital family – and calculates a diameter of 3.7 kilometers.

Naming 

This minor planet was named after Soviet writer and public figure, Aleksey Nikolayevich Tolstoy (1883–1945). The official naming citation was published by the Minor Planet Center on 19 October 1994 .

References

External links 
 Asteroid Lightcurve Database (LCDB), query form (info )
 Dictionary of Minor Planet Names, Google books
 Asteroids and comets rotation curves, CdR – Observatoire de Genève, Raoul Behrend
 Discovery Circumstances: Numbered Minor Planets (1)-(5000) – Minor Planet Center
 
 

003771
003771
Discoveries by Lyudmila Zhuravleva
Named minor planets
19740920